The Austin Film Critics Association Award for Best Film Editing is an annual award given by the Austin Film Critics Association, honoring the best in film editor. This category was first awarded in 2018.

Winners
Legend:

2010s

2020s

See also
Academy Award for Best Editing

References

Austin Film Critics Association Awards
Film editing awards